Eudiadora is a genus of beetles in the family Buprestidae, containing the following species:

 Eudiadora bronzeola Cobos, 1959
 Eudiadora kerremansi Obenberger, 1932
 Eudiadora meliboeoides Obenberger, 1947
 Eudiadora pulchra (Obenberger, 1922)

References

Buprestidae genera